Private Carlton N. Camp (January 5, 1845 – September 1, 1926) was an American soldier who fought in the American Civil War. Camp received the country's highest award for bravery during combat, the Medal of Honor, for his action during the Third Battle of Petersburg in Virginia on 2 April 1865. He was honored with the award on 21 December 1909.

Biography
Camp was born on 5 January 1845 in Hanover, New Hampshire. He enlisted into the 18th New Hampshire Infantry on 6 September 1864. He died on 1 September 1926 and his remains are interred at the Etna Cemetery in Hanover, New Hampshire.

Medal of Honor citation

See also

List of American Civil War Medal of Honor recipients: A–F

References

1845 births
1926 deaths
People of New Hampshire in the American Civil War
Union Army officers
United States Army Medal of Honor recipients
American Civil War recipients of the Medal of Honor